Fitch Waterman Taylor (August 4, 1803July 24, 1865) was an American minister, chaplain, and author.

He was the son of Col. Jeremiah and Lucy Taylor, of Middle Haddam, Connecticut, and was born August 4, 1803.

He went to New York City at the age of fifteen, with a mercantile life in view, but a change in his religious views led him after two or three years to enter on a course of study in preparation for the ministry of the Protestant Episcopal Church. He graduated from Yale College in 1828. His first charge was"in the Episcopal Diocese of Maryland. In 1841 he received the appointment of Chaplain in the U. S. Navy, which he held twenty-four years, being-at the time of his death the Senior Chaplain in the service. In the course of his sea service he made a voyage around the world on the USS Columbia, an account of which he published under the title of The Flag Ship. He also published other works, and at his death left behind him several volumes in manuscript.

He died in Brooklyn, L. I., July 24, 1865, aged 62 years.

External links

 Books by Taylor

1803 births
1865 deaths
People from East Hampton, Connecticut
Yale College alumni
United States Navy chaplains
American Episcopal clergy
19th-century American writers
19th-century American male writers
19th-century American Episcopalians
19th-century American clergy